A vehicle registration plate, also known as a number plate (British English), license plate or licence plate (American English and Canadian English respectively), is a metal or plastic plate or plates attached to a motor vehicle or trailer for official identification purposes. The registration identifier is a numeric or alphanumeric code that uniquely identifies the vehicle within the issuing authority's database. In Europe most countries have adopted a format for registration plates that satisfies the requirements in the Vienna Convention on Road Traffic, which states that cross-border vehicles must display a distinguishing code for the country of registration on the rear of the vehicle. This sign may be an oval sticker placed separately from the registration plate, or may be incorporated into the plate. When the distinguishing sign is incorporated into the registration plate, it must also appear on the front plate of the vehicle, and may be supplemented with the flag or emblem of the national state, or the emblem of the regional economic integration organisation to which the country belongs. An example of such format is the common EU format, with the EU flag above the country code issued in EU member states.

Format
The vast majority of European countries issue registration plates that are:
 520 by 110 mm (20.5 by 4.3 inches)
 520 by 120 mm (20.5 by 4.7 inches)

This is one of the basic standard sizes worldwide.

The others are:
 305 by 152 mm (12.0 by 6.0 inches)
 305 by 160 mm (12.0 by 6.3 inches)
 372 by 135 mm (14.6 by 5.3 inches)

Some European countries use registration plates in other formats:
 330 by 140 mm (13.0 by 5.5 inches) in Andorra
 440 by 120 mm (17.3 by 4.7 inches) in Finland
 260 by 110 mm (10.2 by 4.3 inches) in Monaco
 390 by 120 mm (15.4 by 4.7 inches) in San Marino
 300 by 80 mm (11.8 by 3.1 inches) in Switzerland and Liechtenstein (only front plates)
 360 by 110 mm (14.1 by 4.3 inches) in Italy (only front plates)
 390 by 130 mm (15.4 by 5.1 inches) and 345 by 130 mm (13.5 by 5.1 inches) in Åland

European Union 
The common EU format of having a blue section on the extreme left with EU circle of stars and the country code was introduced by Council Regulation (EC) No 2411/98 of 3 November 1998 and entered into force on 11 November 1998. It was based on a model registration plate which three member states had already introduced: Ireland (1991), Portugal (1992) and Germany (1994). Luxembourg plates had displayed the EU flag on the left since 1988. Vehicles with registration plates in the EU format do not need to display the white oval international vehicle registration code while within the European Economic Area, or in countries party to the Vienna Convention on Road Traffic (except if the plate is issued in Cyprus, Ireland, Malta and Spain).

 The common design consists of a blue strip on the left side of the plate. This blue strip has the EU flag symbol (twelve yellow stars), along with the country code of the member state in which the vehicle is registered. All EU countries now issue plates in the common format, but the use of the EU flag on registration plates is optional for member states.
 EU member states that require foreign vehicles to display a distinguishing sign of the country of origin are obliged by Article 3 of EC 2411/98 to accept the standard design as a distinguishing sign when displayed on a vehicle registered in another member state. The requirement to display a distinguishing sign stems from the Vienna Convention on Road Traffic, and the regulation is referencing the recognition of distinguishing signs according to that convention.
 EU format plates are either white or yellow, on a plate wider than it is tall. Yellow registration plates are used both front and rear in Luxembourg and the Netherlands. Denmark and Hungary use yellow plates for vehicles registered as commercial vehicles. Denmark implemented the EU format on a voluntary basis in 2009. Danish plates have a small holographic strip to the right of the blue EU strip. In Greece, Cyprus, Latvia and Sweden yellow plates are used for taxi vehicles.
 Belgium uses red characters and is the only country not to use the standard black-on-white or black-on-yellow combination; with the introduction of European-style plates in November 2010, a slightly darker shade of red was chosen (RAL 3003) to improve legibility.
 Most European countries use metal plates, however France and Ireland use a mixture of flat plastic and metal plates. Flat plastic plates have earlier also been used in Sweden.

Other countries 
Several non-EU European states have implemented formats similar to the EU format, with national flags or symbols in place of the circle of stars. Vehicles with such registration plates, issued in countries party to the Vienna Convention on Road Traffic, do not need to display the white oval international vehicle registration code while within countries signatory to the Vienna Convention on Road Traffic.

 Norway is an example of such a state, issuing registration plates with the Norwegian flag replacing the circle of stars and the country code N. In Norway, regular plates are white with black characters, however, cars with front seats only (used for carrying goods) have green plates with black characters. Norwegian registration plates are made of metal, but flat plastic plates has also been used earlier. Ukraine issues plates similar to the Norwegian ones, with the Ukrainian flag above the country code UA. Moldovan registration plates have a wider than usual blue band with the Moldovan flag and the international country code MD. Albanian registration plates have a double-headed eagle above the country code AL.
 Bosnia and Herzegovina issues plates with a blue strip on the left side of the plate with the country code BIH, but without the EU stars or any other symbol. So does Turkey (TR) (which is in a customs union with the EU), Montenegro (MNE), North Macedonia (NMK) and Serbia (SRB).
 Belarus issues registration plates with the national flag above the country code on the left side, but without the blue strip. Iceland issues plates similar to the Belarusian plates, with the Icelandic flag above the country code IS on the left side. Iceland, however, is not party to the Vienna Convention on Road Traffic. 
 Andorra and Monaco use registration plates with their coat of arms above the respective country codes (AND and MC). San Marino issues similar plates but with the text "Repubblica di San Marino" underneath the coat of arms, instead of the country code RSM.
 Of those states that joined in the 2004 enlargement of the European Union Malta already used EU format plates, while Latvia, Poland and Lithuania had used plates displaying the national flag before their accession, as did Bulgaria and Romania before their accession in 2007.
 United Kingdom: yellow plates at the rear and white at the front and can be flat plastic or metal. Since 2021, the European symbol of a circle of stars must not be displayed with any of the following identifying letters (due to Brexit). Only registration plates with the distinguishing code "UK" (coloured black or blue) on its own, or together with the Union Flag (orientated in landscape) are valid in other countries party to the Vienna Convention on Road Traffic. 
 England, Scotland and Wales: owners here may choose to display plates with the national flag of England, Scotland or Wales, or the Union Flag and the code names "ENG", "Eng", "ENGLAND" or "England" for the English flag, "SCO", "Sco", "SCOTLAND" or "Scotland" for the Scottish flag, "CYM", "Cym", "CYMRU", "Cymru", "WALES" or "Wales" for the Welsh flag, "GB", "GREAT BRITAIN", "Great Britain", "UK", "UNITED KINGDOM" or "United Kingdom" for the Union Flag respectively. With such an arrangement, a "UK" sticker MUST ALSO be affixed at the rear of the vehicle when driving abroad.
 Northern Ireland: motorists with vehicles registered here are not permitted to display the letters NI alongside any flag; only the Union Flag alongside the "UK" code being optionally permitted.
 Until 28 September 2021, the United Kingdom used "GB" as the identifying letters. This was changed after the British government notified the United Nations "that the United Kingdom is changing the distinguishing sign that it had previously selected for display in international traffic on vehicles registered in the United Kingdom, from 'GB' to 'UK.
 Gibraltar uses plates similar to the EU format, but without a flag or symbol, only the code GBZ. As in the UK, yellow plates at the rear and white at the front.
 The Crown dependencies of Guernsey and Jersey and the Isle of Man have registration plates that are different from those used in the UK. Guernsey plates sometimes contain the letters GBG below the Guernsey flag on the left side. Jersey registration plates may incorporate the coat of arms of Jersey in a white strip on the left, along with the country identifier GBJ, and since 2004 Manx plates may incorporate the Manx flag and the international country identification code GBM.

Common letter and digit systems between countries
Several countries have made efforts to avoid duplicating registration numbers used by other countries. This is not completely successful and there are occasional difficulties in connection with parking fines and automatic speed cameras.

 Belgium (until 2010), Cyprus, Finland, Georgia (until 2014), Hungary (1990-2022), Lithuania, Malta, Sweden (1974-2019), and Moldova (since 2014) each use combinations of first three letters and then three digits.
 Bulgaria uses plate numbers in the form A[A]-0000-AA, i.e. one or two letters representing the region, then four digits, then two more letters. All letters used are intersection of Latin and Cyrillic alphabet, i.e. A, B, C, E, H, K, M, O, P, T, X and Y. The same format is in use in Ukraine, N.Macedonia and Spain until 2000 (but still valid).
 Greece uses a combination of three letters (which are chosen from the 14 character shapes which appear in both the Latin and the Greek alphabet (but not necessarily with the same sound values), i.e. A, B, E, Z, H, I, K, M, N, O, P, T, Y, X in Greek alphabetic order) and four numbers, in the form of AAA-0000, while Spain uses a four number-three letter combination, in the form of 0000 BBB (vowels and some maybe confusing consonants, like Ñ and Q, are not used)
 Denmark and Norway use two letters and five digits (AB 12345), while trailers use two letters and four digits. The plates look very similar, but Denmark has a red border around the plate. Use of the country code on the plate may mitigate this problem (Norway began using the system on 1 November 2006). Denmark has begun running out of combinations in this style and has now introduced combinations previously reserved for the Faroe Islands for EU style registration plates (which will use different letters from non-EU style plates).
 The Netherlands (until 2008) and Portugal both use three groups of two characters (letters or numbers) in several sequences: AB-12-CD, 12-34-AB, 12-AB-34, AB-12-34, etc. However, Portuguese plates have a white background, while those of Netherlands (after 1 January 1978) have a yellow one, though both countries also use white letters on blue plates for classic cars. Furthermore, newer plates on Dutch vehicles only contain consonants, to avoid coincidental abbreviations or words. Also some sensitive letter combinations, such as SS or SD, are not used. The combination 'AA' is reserved for cars of the royal family. Dutch company registered bus, truck and/or minivan plates always start with a B or a V. Dutch taxis use blue registration plates. The number of new combinations ran out in 2008. New registered cars in the Netherlands now use the format of two digits-three letters-one digit (12-ABC-3).
 Belgium used the sequence ABC-123 between 1973 and 2008. When these combinations ran out in 2008, the inverse sequence 123-ABC was adopted, with the first plate in the new series issued on 25 June 2008. With the introduction of the EU format registration plates on 15 November 2010, a seven-character combination 1-ABC-234 is used and the previous 123-ABC was discontinued. However, the six-character plates will remain valid, and no date is set for their expiration. Since Belgian plates are linked to an owner rather than to a vehicle, these older plates are likely to remain in use for a considerable time. As a way to phase out the six-character plates, future vehicle subscriptions will only be possible on the seven-character plates. Private numbers, not following any notation, are also allowed.
 Luxembourg standard registration plates use two letters and four digits (AB 1234). Plates with 5 digits (12345) and 4 digits (1234) are also issued upon request. Older series with two letters and three digits (AB 123), and one letter and 4 digits (A 1234) are no longer issued but are still in use. Special plates for diplomats, the government, the grand-ducal family, military vehicles and temporary registrations exist and follow specific rules. Two letters and three digits (AB 123) is also used in Northern Cyprus, and until 1973 it was used on the entire island of Cyprus.
 Current registrations allocated in Romania and the United Kingdom (where the registration contains two digits) are both of the form AB 12 CDE. The Romanian rear plates are white whereas UK ones are yellow. There is also a difference in the spacing and the font. In 2010, Bucharest, the capital of Romania, adopted the form B 123 AAA, three digits and three letters, because the number of cars had risen. In the United Kingdom, B 123 AAA was issued to cars registered from August 1984 to August 1985. Aside from this, some county codes can clash (MH, in Romania it stands for Mehedinți, and in the United Kingdom, it stands for Manchester).
 Until 1973/74 the Swedish pattern was one letter representing the län (county) where the car was first registered, followed by four or five digits. However, in the more populated län, a second letter was introduced over time. For example, vehicles from southernmost county got the letter M + five digits, later also MA + five digits, MB + five digits etc. A problem was that the two northernmost counties had already been given two letters, the letter prefixes AC and BD, as the number of counties exceeded the number of usable letters. This system gave similar numbers as Denmark and Norway. The ABC 123 system was introduced gradually from July 1973 until June 1974. All vehicles had to switch plates, the old were not permitted after this.
 Slovakia uses MM 123AB and Croatia uses MM 123-A, MM 123-AB, MM 1234-A or MM 1234-AB (MM being the two-letter city code). Both countries use the national coat of arms after first two letters. Croatia uses only Croatian Latin letters without diacritics, except for city codes, like ČK for Čakovec.
 Montenegro and Serbia, currently not members of the EU, used the following: MM 12-34, MM 123-45 or MM 123-456 (MM being two letter abbreviation of municipality), and having state flag (of former Yugoslavia, later Serbia and Montenegro) between municipality and numbers. Montenegro left that system in 2007, and introduced new format: MM AB 123 with Montenegrin coat of arms in circular shape between municipality and letter sequence. Blue strip with MNE country code is placed in the left side, with vacant place for EU stars, in case of joining the Union. Serbia also uses new system since 2011, with blue strip country code SRB: MM 123-AB and MM 1234-AB, with Serbian coat of arms between municipality and number sequence. The first two letters on the Serbian plates represent the municipality code, written in Latin letters, and repeated in Cyrillic characters with small letters under the coat of arms. The following system is used for taxi vehicles:BG 123 TX or BG 1234 TX and recently even BG 12345 TX, where a TX combination is reserved for this purpose only (another taxi vehicles have private vehicle plates). Since 2017, Serbia stopped issuing plates with last two letters containing W, Q, Y, X (except TX), Č, Ć, Š, Ž, and Đ, however Serbian Latin letters with diacritics are still used to mark the municipality code, like ČA for Čačak or ŠA for Šabac.
 Poland and the United Kingdom have both used AAA 123A. In Poland these were issued from 1976 to 2000, in the UK, they were issued from 1963 to 1983, with those issued prior to 1973 being the same colour as their Polish counterparts (white on black). These plates are still valid in both countries.

Differing numbering systems
Individual European countries use differing numbering schemes and text fonts:
 Most countries, including Austria, Bulgaria, Croatia, the Czech Republic, Germany, Greece, Ireland, Montenegro, North Macedonia, Norway, Poland, Romania, Serbia, Slovenia and Switzerland (formerly also Sweden until 1974, Italy until 1994, Bosnia and Herzegovina until 1998, Lithuania and Spain until 2000, Estonia until 2004, Albania until 2011 and Slovakia until 2023, also former countries East Germany until 1990, Soviet Union until 1991, Czechoslovakia until 1993, Yugoslavia until 1998 and Serbia and Montenegro until 2011), have systems in which there is a direct link between a letter or letters appearing on the plate and the town or district where the plate was issued (e.g. "B" and "M" in Germany for Berlin and Munich, "BG" and "KG" in Serbia for Belgrade and Kragujevac and "AX" and "KY" in Greece for Achaea and Corfu). Some countries, including Austria, Germany, Slovenia, and Switzerland, even include a regional or municipal coat of arms on the plate, but Croatia, Montenegro and Serbia include a national coat of arms. In Ireland, all registration plates have the name of the county of registration in Irish in smaller letters on the top.
 France (until 2009), and Turkey and Russia (since October 2013) use a system with an indirect number relation to the car's place of registration. Formerly in France, the last two characters on a plate comprised the departmental code of registration. This pattern was discontinued, but in response to popular outcry, France added a second colour bar, on the right edge of the plate, where the departmental code (no longer a part of the registration number) appears. The Turkish system has since been overridden by most provinces giving out three letter-three number codes (99 XXX 000) in alphabetical order, regardless of province subdivisions.
 The United Kingdom uses a system based on the region where the car was first registered and the date of registration, for example CA52 GJK, where the "C" stands for Wales (the name of that country in Welsh being Cymru), the "A" stands for Cardiff (the letters A-O assigned to the city), and the "52" means that the car was registered in the period September 2002 to February 2003.
 Belgium, Bosnia and Herzegovina, Denmark, Iceland, Estonia (after 2004), Finland, Hungary, Latvia, Lithuania (after 2000), Luxembourg, the Netherlands, Portugal, Slovakia (after 2023) and Sweden (after 1974) use plates that do not denote the location where the car is registered. Since 2000 Spain no longer uses province codes on plates but codes like 'B' for Barcelona or 'M' for Madrid can still be seen, for cars registered before that date. Italy, also, did not use the province codes on plates between 1994 and 1999.
 Italy, since 1999, has added a blue strip on either side. On the right one are the two digits of the year when the plate was issued (e.g. "99", "05", "08") and below that there may be an optional two-letter code for the province, such as "MO" for the Province of Modena. Albania and France have adopted similar formats.
 Portuguese registration plates since late 1998 have a yellow strip on the right side, with one number at the top and another at the bottom separated by a line, respectively the year and month of the vehicle's registration. This strip was discontinued for the new registration plates issued since March 2020.
 Irish registration plates also contain the year in which the vehicle was registered. A car registered in 2008 would have the format 08-XX-XXXX. In 2013, this was updated to specify which half of the year the registration occurred. So from January to June, the registration plate would show (for 2018) 181-XX-XXXX, whereas from July to December, the plate instead shows 182-XX-XXXX.
 Turkish registration plates consist of letters and digits in combinations of 99 AB 999, 99 A 9999, 99 ABC 99, 99 AB 9999 or 99 A 99999 where the first two digits show which province the vehicle is registered from. First two digits numbers go from 01 to 81 (as there are 81 provinces in Turkey) and each one is assigned to a province with alphabetical order e.g. 01 is the code of the province Adana or 34 is the code of the province Istanbul. All 81 provinces used to use "01 AB 123" style plates initially until all combinations ran out, then the province starts to use 01 A 1234 then 01 ABC 12 etc. As a result, three largest provinces i.e. Istanbul, Ankara and İzmir are currently issuing 99 ABC 999 style plates. 99 A 99999 series are not regular since they are only used in provinces where commercial vehicles are abundant e.g. Bursa to distinguish these vehicles there from passenger cars. Letters "I" and "O" are only used in the middle 01 ABC 12 series e.g. 34 YOC 34 or 06 TIL 56 to avoid confusion with numerals "1" and "0" respectively. As an exception to this rule, there is a "HO" series that is only granted to privately operated city buses (halk otobüsleri in Turkish). Also some letters combinations like "PKK" are not issued due to their referring to political organisations or words likely to cause offence.

Cross-border traffic
According to the Vienna Convention on Road Traffic, vehicles in cross-border traffic are obliged to display a distinguishing sign of the country of registration on the rear of the vehicle. This sign may either be placed separately from the registration plate or, after the convention was amended in 2006, may be incorporated into the vehicle registration plate. One of the main benefits of the convention for motorists is the obligation on signatory countries to recognise the legality of vehicles from other signatory countries. The following requirements must be met when driving outside the country of registration:
 The physical requirements for the separate sign are defined in Annex 3 of the Vienna Convention on Road Traffic, which states that the letters shall be in black on a white background having the shape of an ellipse with the major axis horizontal. The distinguishing sign should not be affixed in such a way that it could be confused with the registration number or impair its legibility.
 When the distinguishing sign is incorporated into the registration plate, it must also appear on the front registration plate of the vehicle, and may be supplemented with the flag or emblem of the national state, or the emblem of the regional economic integration organisation to which the country belongs. The distinguishing sign should be displayed on the far left or far right on the registration plate. When a symbol/flag/emblem is also displayed, the distinguishing sign shall obligatory be placed on the far left on the plate. The distinguishing sign shall be positioned so to be easy identifiable and so that it cannot be confused with the registration number or impair its legibility. The distinguishing sign shall therefore be at least a different colour from the registration number, or have a different background colour to that reserved for the registration number, or be clearly separated from the registration number, preferably with a line.

The common EU format of having a blue section on the extreme left with EU circle of stars and the country code was introduced by Council Regulation (EC) No 2411/98 of 3 November 1998 and entered into force on 11 November 1998. According to Article 3 of the regulation shall member states that require vehicles registered in another member state to display a distinguishing registration sign also recognise distinguishing signs issued in accordance with the regulation (the common EU format). After the amendment of the Vienna Convention on Road Traffic in 2006, registration plates issued in the common EU format also satisfies the requirements of the named convention and hence is also valid in all countries party to the Vienna Convention on Road Traffic (if the issuing country is party to the convention).

After Brexit the European Commission confirmed that British cars with registration plates with the distinguishing sign incorporated do not need a separate sign when driving in EU countries party to the Vienna Convention on Road Traffic. If the registration plate does not include the distinguishing sign, or if the vehicle is driven in an EU country not party to the Vienna Convention, a separate sign has to be displayed at the rear of the vehicle. All EU countries except Cyprus, Ireland, Malta and Spain are party to the convention.

Some European countries are not party to the Vienna Convention on Road Traffic. Cyprus, Iceland, Ireland, Malta and Spain are examples of non-signatory countries. Those who have not ratified the convention may be parties to the older 1949 Geneva Convention on Road Traffic, which is the case of the aforementioned countries. According to the Geneva convention, a distinguishing sign of the country of registration must be displayed on the rear of the vehicle. This sign must be placed separately from the registration plate and may not be incorporated into the vehicle registration plate. The letters shall be in black on a white background having the shape of an ellipse with the major axis horizontal.

List
Vehicle registration plates of each country are described in the following table:

Motorcycle plates are used for motorcycles and vehicles where mounting space is an issue, such as taxis which display their , and vehicles imported from countries where the mounting space was not originally designed to take European-sized plates (e.g. USA).

Moped plates are used for 2-wheeled moped and, in the European Union and EER countries for 4-wheeled mopeds (light quadricycle)

Countries 

 Notes

Transcontinental countries

Dependent territories 

 Notes

Disputed territories

Timeline 

Dependencies and disputed territories

See also
 International vehicle registration code

References

External links
 

Europe
Road transport in Europe